Allium oleraceum, the field garlic, is a Eurasian species of wild onion. It is a bulbous perennial that grows wild in dry places, reaching  in height. It reproduces by seed, bulbs and by the production of small bulblets in the flower head (similarly to Allium vineale). Unlike A. vineale, it is very rare with A. oleraceum to find flower-heads containing bulbils only. In addition, the spathe in A. oleraceum is in two parts.

Description
The main stem is usually rounded, but is occasionally flattened, and bears two to four leaves and a terminal inflorescence composed of a number of small, stalked, pinkish-brown flowers and sometimes a few bulblets. The papery bracts have long points which often much overtop the flowers, the stamens of which do not protrude.

Distribution 
Allium oleraceum is widespread across most of Europe, with additional populations in Turkey and the Caucasus. It is sparingly naturalised in scattered locations in North America.

In the United Kingdom, A. oleraceum is found in dry, grassy places, usually steeply sloping and calcareous soils, and on open sunny banks in river floodplains. A. oleraceum is scattered throughout England and very scattered in Wales, Scotland and Ireland. Erosion of coastal areas leads to a reduction in the available habitat for this species, leading to population declines.

Allium oleraceum subsp. girerdii was formerly included, but is now classified as Allium oporinanthum.

See also 
 Allium vineale
 Allium monanthum

References

External links
 

Garlic
oleraceum
Flora of Europe
Flora of temperate Asia
Plants described in 1753
Taxa named by Carl Linnaeus